Reuben's Accomplice (styled Reubens Accomplice) is an American band from Phoenix, Arizona.

The group formed in 1994 at Thunderbird High School in Phoenix and released several 7" singles over the course of the 1990s, touring with DIY punk and emo acts such as Jimmy Eat World, Pedro the Lion, The Promise Ring, and Karate. The group's debut full-length, I Blame the Scenery was issued on Better Looking Records in 2001. Among the guests on the album are members of Calexico, Giant Sand, and Jimmy Eat World, as well as Neko Case. Their follow-up full-length, The Bull, the Balloon, and the Family, arrived in 2004.

In 2009, the group toured with Jimmy Eat World on the Clarity 10-year anniversary tour, having been the group's opening band on the original 1999 Clarity tour. Their newest album, Sons of Men, was released in 2012.

Members
Current
 Jeff Bufano – guitar, vocals
 Ryan Kennedy – bass
 Chris Corak – guitar, vocals
 John O'Riley – drums

Former
 Andy Eames – bass
 Jim Knapp – drums

Discography

Albums
 We Can Hold Our Own (Self released, 1994)
 I Blame the Scenery (Better Looking Records, 2001)
 The Bull, the Balloon, and the Family (Western Tread Recordings, 2004)
 Sons of Men (Arctic Rodeo Recordings, 2012)

Singles
 Red Handed Double Single (2 x 7" records) (Jerk Records, 1995)
 If There Were No Borders We'd Still Live In The Same State (Jerk Records, 1998)
 Sons of Men Single EP (2009)

Compilations
 Libations Unlimited: Phoenix '97–'99 (Sentry Press, 1999)
Song: "New Jam City"
 Not One Light Red: A Modified Document (Sunset Alliance, 2000)
Song: "Leave The City"
 Not One Light Red: A Desert Extended (Sunset Alliance, 2002)
Song: "Don't Forget the Promise"

References

American emo musical groups
Musical groups from Phoenix, Arizona
Rock music groups from Arizona